Jelian (also Romanized as Jelīān, Jaleyān, Jalīān, and Jalyān) is a village in Now Bandegan Rural District, Now Bandegan District, Fasa County, Fars Province, Iran. At the 2006 census, its population was 1,735, in 443 families.

References 

Populated places in Fasa County